Marcelo Cláudio Mendes Pereira (2 March 1979), known as Marcelo Mendes, is a Brazilian football manager and former player who played as a defensive midfielder. He is the current assistant manager of Sampaio Corrêa.

Playing career
Born in Cajapió, Maranhão, Marcelo Mendes started his career with local side Americano-MA before moving to Juventus-SP, where he made his debut as a senior in 1999. In 2001 he moved to Ceará, and featured regularly for the club as they retained their Série B status.

Marcelo Mendes moved to Joinville for the 2004 campaign, and subsequently failed to settle for a club in the remainder of his career. He represented Campinense, Rioverdense, Ferroviário (two stints), Horizonte (two stints), Madureira, Bangu (on loan), Sampaio Corrêa, Viana, São José-MA, Imperatriz, Americano-MA, Boa Esporte and Tricordiano. He retired with the latter in 2013, aged 34.

Managerial career
After retiring, Marcelo Mendes had his first managerial experience in 2015, while in charge of his first club Americano-MA. In 2016, he took over Araioses for the year's Campeonato Maranhense, but his reign only lasted six matches.

Marcelo Mendes subsequently returned to Americano, being an under-20 and interim manager before rejoining another club he represented as a player, Sampaio Corrêa, in 2017. Initially an assistant of the under-20 team, he was named manager of the squad in 2018, and was appointed assistant of the first team in 2019.

In April 2021, after the dismissal of Rafael Guanaes, Marcelo Mendes was named interim manager of the main squad, but did not manage the club in any match as they appointed Daniel Neri.

Honours

Player
Ceará
Campeonato Cearense: 2002

References

External links

1979 births
Association football midfielders
Bangu Atlético Clube players
Boa Esporte Clube players
Brazilian footballers
Brazilian football managers
Campeonato Brasileiro Série B players
Campeonato Brasileiro Série C players
Campinense Clube players
Ceará Sporting Club players
Clube Atlético Juventus players
Clube Atlético Tricordiano players
Ferroviário Atlético Clube (CE) players
Horizonte Futebol Clube players
Joinville Esporte Clube players
Living people
Madureira Esporte Clube players
Sportspeople from Maranhão
Sampaio Corrêa Futebol Clube managers
Sampaio Corrêa Futebol Clube players
Sociedade Imperatriz de Desportos players